The 2017 PBA All-Star Week was the annual all-star week of the Philippine Basketball Association (PBA)'s 2016–17 season which was on April 26 to 30, 2017 on three different venues covering Luzon, Visayas and Mindanao. The all-star week kicked off in Cagayan de Oro (Mindanao) on April 26, then was held in Lucena (Luzon) together with the skills challenge on April 28, then capped off on April 30 in Cebu City.

Three PBA All-Star teams, one each with players representing Luzon, Visayas and Mindanao pitted against Gilas Pilipinas, the men's national basketball team. Gilas Pilipinas players played for the PBA All-Star team if they hail to the game's host region.

Mindanao leg

Shooting Stars Challenge

All-Star Game

Roster

Game

Luzon leg

Obstacle Challenge

Gold represent the current champion.

First round
The winners of each pairing in the first round advanced to the final round.
Simon Enciso def. Roi Sumang
Sol Mercado def. Stanley Pringle
LA Revilla def. Emman Monfort
RJ Jazul def. Ed Daquioag
Alex Cabagnot def. Mon Abundo
Maverick Ahanmisi def. Kris Rosales

Three-Point Contest

Gold represent current champion.

Slam Dunk Contest

Gold represent the current champion.

All-Star Game

Roster

INJ1 Marc Pingris was unable to participate due to a hip injury.
 Jay Washington played in place of Marc Pingris.

Game

Visayas leg

All-Star Game

Roster

INJ2 Aldrech Ramos was unable to participate due to a fractured nose.
 J. R. Quiñahan played in place of Aldrech Ramos.
 June Mar Fajardo and Terrence Romeo are initially supposed to play for the PBA Visayas All-Stars, but was moved to the Gilas team in preparation for the SEABA Tournament. LA Tenorio and Rabeh Al- Hussaini replaced them in the PBA Visayas All-Stars lineup.

Game

See also
 2016–17 PBA season
 Philippine Basketball Association
 Philippine Basketball Association All-Star Weekend

References

2017
2016–17 PBA season
Philippines men's national basketball team games